Mangawhai Heads is a township in Northland, New Zealand. Waipu is 21 kilometres northwest, and Mangawhai is 5 kilometres southwest.

Mangawhai Heads Beach is an intermediate-level surf beach.

The Mangawhai Cliffs Walkway, north of the township, is 4.5 kilometres long and has a lookout point.

Demographics

Mangawhai Heads had a population of 1,995 at the 2018 New Zealand census, an increase of 756 people (61.0%) since the 2013 census, and an increase of 1,068 people (115.2%) since the 2006 census. There were 849 households, comprising 999 males and 999 females, giving a sex ratio of 1.0 males per female. The median age was 54.5 years (compared with 37.4 years nationally), with 306 people (15.3%) aged under 15 years, 195 (9.8%) aged 15 to 29, 831 (41.7%) aged 30 to 64, and 666 (33.4%) aged 65 or older.

Ethnicities were 91.1% European/Pākehā, 11.6% Māori, 2.6% Pacific peoples, 3.9% Asian, and 1.4% other ethnicities. People may identify with more than one ethnicity.

The percentage of people born overseas was 21.5, compared with 27.1% nationally.

Although some people chose not to answer the census's question about religious affiliation, 56.8% had no religion, 31.4% were Christian, 0.3% were Hindu, 0.2% were Muslim, 0.6% were Buddhist and 2.1% had other religions.

Of those at least 15 years old, 291 (17.2%) people had a bachelor's or higher degree, and 330 (19.5%) people had no formal qualifications. The median income was $27,300, compared with $31,800 nationally. 240 people (14.2%) earned over $70,000 compared to 17.2% nationally. The employment status of those at least 15 was that 612 (36.2%) people were employed full-time, 252 (14.9%) were part-time, and 45 (2.7%) were unemployed.

Notes

Kaipara District
Populated places in the Northland Region